David Goffin defeated Alex Molčan in the final, 3–6, 6–3, 6–3 to win the singles tennis title at the 2022 Grand Prix Hassan II. It was Goffin's sixth ATP singles title.

Benoît Paire was the defending champion from when the event was last held in 2019, but withdrew before the beginning of the tournament.

Seeds

Draw

Finals

Top half

Bottom half

Qualifying

Seeds

Qualifiers

Lucky loser

Qualifying draw

First qualifier

Second qualifier

Third qualifier

Fourth qualifier

References

External links
 Main draw
 Qualifying draw

Grand Prix Hassan II - 1